Drina cowani is a species of butterfly belonging to the lycaenid family described by Alexander Steven Corbet in 1940. It is found in  the Indomalayan realm (Peninsular Malaya, Singapore).

References

External links 
 Drina at Markku Savela's Lepidoptera and Some Other Life Forms

Drina (butterfly)
Butterflies described in 1940